Dumitrești is a commune located in Vrancea County, Romania. It is composed of sixteen villages: Biceștii de Jos, Biceștii de Sus, Blidari, Dumitrești, Dumitreștii de Sus, Dumitreștii-Faţă, Găloiești, Lăstuni, Lupoaia, Motnău, Poienița, Roșcari, Siminoc, Tinoasa, Trestia, and Valea Mică.

The commune lies on the banks of the river Râmnicul Sărat and its tributary, the Motnău. It is located in the southern part of the county, on the border with Buzău County. Dumitrești is traversed by national road , which connects it to the west to Chiojdeni and Jitia and to the east to Bordești, Dumbrăveni (where it intersects DN2), Sihlea, and Tătăranu.

Notable people 
Mircea Dumitrescu

References

Communes in Vrancea County
Localities in Western Moldavia